Mount Kokshe, also known as Kokshetau or Kokshe-Tau (Gora Sinyukha, lit. 'blueish mountain') is a mountain in the Kokshetau Massif, Akmola Region, northern Kazakhstan. It is the highest mountain in Akmola Region and the second highest mountain in the northern part of Kazakhstan. 

The mountain is part of the Burabay National Park and is a popular destination, attracting tourists and climbers. It has several walking and scrambling routes leading to its summit and, as such, many walking guides recommend it to the occasional walker wishing to climb a mountain.

Names and etymology
The mountain's official name in Kazakh is Kokshetau or Kokshe-Tau, Kokshe is derived from the common Kazakh word for "blueish", tau, meaning "mountain", thus kokshe + tau meaning "Blueish mountain"; its Russian name is Gora Sinyukha meaning the same. Both names hint at the bluish tint of the mountains when viewed from a distance.

Geography 
It is located near lake Kishi Shabakty, west of Lake Burabay, dominating the skyline of the lake area. 

Mount Kokshe has an absolute elevation of 947 m. It is situated in the Kazakh Uplands and is the second-highest mountain in the northern part of Kazakhstan, after Mount Akbet (at ) which is located in the Bayanaul Range, Pavlodar Region. The relief of the mountain area is spurry-ridgy with narrow rocky watersheds. The mountain slopes are covered with pine and pine-birch forests.

See also
 Kokshetau

Image gallery

References

External links

 Mount Kokshe is at coordinates 
 "Gora Sinyukha, Kazakhstan" on peakbagger

Kazakh Uplands
Geography of Akmola Region
Mountains under 1000 metres